is a junction passenger railway station located in the city of Wakayama, Wakayama Prefecture, Japan, operated by the private railway operator Nankai Electric Railway.

Lines

Station layout
The station consists of two opposed side platforms connected by a footbridge.

Platforms

Adjacent stations

History
It was renamed March 21, 1903.

Passenger statistics
In fiscal 2019, the station was used by an average of 2786 passengers daily (boarding passengers only).

Surrounding area
 Wakayama Prefectural Wakayama Kita High School Station East

See also
List of railway stations in Japan

References

External links

  

Railway stations in Japan opened in 1898
Railway stations in Wakayama Prefecture
Wakayama (city)